Leonard Owen Edwards (born 30 May 1930) is a Welsh former professional footballer who played as a wing half in the Football League for Sheffield Wednesday, Brighton & Hove Albion and Crewe Alexandra. He was on the books of his home-town club of Wrexham without playing league football for them.

References

1930 births
Living people
Footballers from Wrexham
Welsh footballers
Association football wing halves
Wrexham A.F.C. players
Sheffield Wednesday F.C. players
Brighton & Hove Albion F.C. players
Crewe Alexandra F.C. players
English Football League players